The High Council of Justice is the national council of the judiciary of Belgium. It was established in 1999 by Article 151 of the Belgian Constitution and is responsible for exercising external oversight over the operation of the judicial system, handling complaints, submitting advice and opinions to policymakers, nominating candidates for appointments to the judiciary and preparing guidelines for the training of the members of the magistracy.

See also 
List of Belgian Judges

External links
 Website of the High Council of Justice

Law of Belgium
1999 establishments in Belgium
National councils of the judiciary
Judiciary of Belgium